, better known as Seigo Yuri Akui, is a Japanese professional boxer.

Personal life
He played association football until the first year of junior high school, when he took up boxing under the guidance of his father and uncle. He began his amateur career after entering Kurashiki Suisho High School, and competed in the second and third years.

Professional boxing career

Light flyweight

First Rookie of the Year tournament
Akui had a short amateur career during which he amassed a 20–7 record, before making his debut at the age of 19. He made his debut against Yuki Sueyoshi on 20 April 2014, in the quarterfinals of the West Japan light flyweight Rookie of the Year tournament. He beat Sueyoshi by unanimous decision, with all three judges awarding him all four rounds of the fight. Akui was given an automatic pass for his semifinal bout, which was expected to take place in July 2014, as his opponent pulled withdrew. Akui faced the undefeated Michitaka Muto in the tournament finals on 14 September 2014. He won the fight by unanimous decision, with scores of 40–36, 39-37 and 39–37. Akui was furthermore crowned the tournament MVP.

Akui was scheduled to face the another "Rookie of the Year" regional tournament winner Seita Ogido on 9 November 2014, for the All Japan Rookie of the Year title. The fight was ruled a draw, with two judges being split as to the winner, while the third judge scored it an even 38-38. Ogido was ruled the better fighter however, and advanced to the next round of the tournament.

Second Rookie of the Year tournament
Akui entered the 2015 West Japan Rookie of the Year light flyweight tournament as well, and was scheduled to face Ruka Shobu in the quarterfinals on 19 July 2015. He needed just 100 seconds to beat Shobu by technical knockout. Akui faced Kaminoko Okamura Kentokid in the tournament semifinals, held on 27 September 2015. He won the fight by a first-round knockout. Akui faced Nobuhiro Oshiro in the tournament finals on 15 November 2015. He won the fight by unanimous decision, with scores of 39–37, 39-38 and 39–38. Akui was once again given the West Japan MVP award. Akui was scheduled to fight Hiroki Hosoya for the All Japan Rookie of the Year light flyweight title on 20 December 2015. He won the five round bout by unanimous decision, with scores of 49–47, 48-47 and 48–47.

Flyweight

Move up to flyweight
After managing to win the Rookie tournament in his second try, Akui was scheduled to face Hideaki Yamaji on 3 April 2016, whom he beat by a knockout after just 45 seconds. It was his first fight at flyweight, with his previous fights taking place at 108 pounds. Akui was scheduled to fight his first eight-round bout against Yamato Uchinono on 2 October 2016. He didn't need all eight rounds however, as he stopped Uchinono at the mid-point of the third round. Akui faced a large step up in competition on 3 December 2016, when he scheduled to fight Kenji Ono on a G+ televised card. He won the fight by a first-round technical knockout.

Akui beat the 0-2 Nattawut Siritoem by a 31-second knockout on 16 April 2017. Akui was scheduled to face Ryuto Oho on 16 May 2017, in the semifinals of the Japanese Youth Flyweight four man tournament. He won the fight by a first-round technical knockout. Akui advanced to the tournament finals, held on 23 August 2017, where he faced Junto Nakatani. Nakatani made use of his greater height and reach to win the fight by a sixth-round technical knockout.

Akui was scheduled to face the future WBC light flyweight champion Masamichi Yabuki on 8 April 2018. He won the fight by a first-round knockout, stopping Yabuki 91 seconds into the fight. Akui was scheduled to fight the #10 ranked WBA flyweight contender Jaysever Abcede on 28 October 2018. Abcede won the fight by a late eight-round technical knockout. Akui rebounded from his second professional loss with a first-round technical knockout of Yoshiki Minato on 28 April 2019.

Japanese flyweight champion
Akui, at the time the #1 ranked flyweight by the Japanese Boxing Commission, was scheduled to face Shun Kosaka, at the time the #2 ranked flyweight by the JBC, for the vacant Japanese flyweight title on 27 October 2019. The bout was scheduled as the main event of a "Momotaro Fight Boxing 38" event, held at the Amakusa Park Gym in Asakuchi, Japan. He won the fight by a first-round technical knockout.

Akui was scheduled to make his first title defense against the #1 ranked JBC flyweight contender Seiya Fujikita on 18 October 2020. He won the fight by unanimous decision, with scores of 98–92, 97-93 and 99–91. Akui was scheduled to make his second title defense against Taku Kuwahara on 21 July 2021. He won the fight by a late tenth-round technical knockout.

Akui was booked to make his third title defense against the former Japanese flyweight champion Takuya Kogawa on 27 February 2022. He won the fight by unanimous decision, with all three judges scoring the fight 100–90 in his favor. Nearly a year later, on 11 January 2023, Akui vacated the Japanese flyweight title.

Rise up the ranks
Akui faced the #14 ranked WBC light-flyweight contender Jayson Vayson in a ten-round flyweight bout on 4 February 2023. The bout headlined the "621st Dynamic Glove" event, which took place at the Korakuen Hall in Tokyo, Japan. He won the fight by unanimous decision, with all three judges awarding him every single round of the bout.

Professional boxing record

References

1995 births
Living people
Sportspeople from Okayama Prefecture
Japanese male boxers
Flyweight boxers
Light-flyweight boxers